The Canada national rugby league team represents Canada in international rugby league football tournaments.

History

1987–2000: Origins
Rugby league was first introduced to Canada in the 1900s but was quickly outlawed by Rugby Union officials and thus became Canadian Football. It was not until the late 1980s that rugby league was re-introduced to Canada at an amateur level, when a short-lived 4-team domestic competition, known as the Tri-Counties Rugby League, was established. Four teams competed in its first year, three in Canada and one in the U.S., the New York-based Adirondacks club.

The Canadian national team played their first game in 1987 against the USA. They then played sporadically throughout the 1990s and participated in the 1995 and '96 Rugby League World Sevens and Rugby League Emerging Nations World Cup in 2000. Following the 2000 Emerging Nations World Cup, the Canadian Rugby League Federation folded. As a result, the national team was disbanded and the sport remained dormant for 10 years.

2010 onwards: Revival

In 2010, a new governing body, Canada Rugby League, was formed. Their first comeback game was in 2010 in the War at the Shore tournament, where they played New England Immortals, a New England representative team, and the New York Knights AMNRL club team, losing both games. The team's international comeback was later in the year in September in the inaugural Colonial Cup. Later that year they competed in the Rugby League Atlantic Cup in Jacksonville, Florida.

Canada's first win since they were reformed came the following year in 2011 against Jamaica. They collected their second win in September, against the US in the second game of the Colonial Cup. However, due to an earlier loss to the US and the resulting aggregate scores, Canada was unable to win the Cup. Canada's international season finished up with a defeat against South Africa, in a warm up game before their 2013 World Cup qualifiers campaign.

In 2014, Stuart Donlan was appointed as head coach. Donlan's first game was the 2014 Colonial Cup's only fixture. He coached Canada to a famous victory which made them the Colonial Cup champions for the very first time. Aaron Zimmerle, the head coach of the Tweed Heads Seagulls, took over the main coaching role in 2015 in their 2017 World Cup qualifying campaign.

After failing to qualify for the 2017 World Cup, the Canada Rugby League Board appointed Benjamin Fleming as coach on a three-year deal. Canada Rugby League Association Vice President David Graham said "the board's decision to appoint Fleming as Head Coach was based on the hard work and passion he has shown since returning to the association last year."

Current squad

1. Andrew Giguere

2. Ethan Langs

3. Michael Mastroianni

4. Emil Borggren

5. Tony Felix

6. Matt Calvert

7. Ryley Jacks

8. Charles Curran

9. Rhys Jacks

10. Dean Parker

11. Skyler Dumas

12. Dominic Witschi

13. Antoine Blanc

14. Kyle Koivisto

15. Eric Moyer

17. James Gwatkin

18. Tyler Doran

19. Mike Gallagher

21. Travis Depasquale

22. Jordon Henry

Competitive Record

International results
Below is the head-to-head record of the Canadian national XIII side up to date as of 25 April 2021.

The following tournaments is a list of notable international competitions that Canada has been competing in since their existence in 1987.

World Cup

Colonial Cup

Caribbean Carnival Cup
The Caribbean Carnival Cup is annual series that has been played between Canada and Jamaica since 2011.

Atlantic Cup

Rankings

See also

Toronto Wolfpack
Rugby league in Canada

References

External links
 Canada Rugby League Website

 
National rugby league teams
Canadian rugby league teams